The 2017 Longford Senior Football Championship was the 101st running of the Longford GAA's premier club Gaelic football tournament for senior graded teams in County Longford, Ireland since the first County Championship was held in 1890 (100 completed since 1890, 1 started but not completed in 1891). The 2017 tournament consisted of 12 teams, with the winner going on to represent Longford in the Leinster Senior Club Football Championship. The championship starts with a group stage and then progresses to a knock out stage.

Mullinalaghta St. Columba's were the defending champions after they defeated Abbeylara in the previous year's final. In the final, they repeated their victory over the same opponents, retaining their title for the first time ever.

This year St. Brigid's Killashee returned to the senior grade after a 3-season absence since relegation in 2013 after claiming the 2016 Longford Intermediate Football Championship title, However they made the straight drop back down to the middle grade after finishing bottom of their group this year. Fr. Manning Gaels also joined them in the middle tier for the first time in 42 seasons, after losing their Relegation Play-off final.

Team changes 

The following teams have changed division since the 2016 championship season.

To S.F.C. 
Promoted from 2016 Longford Intermediate Football Championship
 St Brigid's Killashee – (Intermediate Champions)

From S.F.C. 
Relegated to 2017 Longford Intermediate Football Championship
 Rathcline

Group stage 
All 12 teams entered the competition at this stage. Groups A and B each consisted of 4 seeded teams (the previous year's quarter-finalists) with 3 teams from each group progressing to the quarter-finals. Group C consisted of the 5 unseeded teams (seeding based on the previous year's performance). 2 teams from Group C proceeded to the quarter-finals while the bottom finisher was relegated to the 2018 I.F.C. 3rd and 4th in Group C played off in a Relegation final to decide the second team to be relegated.

Group A 

Round 1:
 Mullinalaghta St Columba's 2-19, 2-8 Longford Slashers, 22/7/2017, 
 Killoe Young Emmets 2-19, 2-14 Dromard, 23/7/2017, 

Round 2:
 Mullinalaghta St Columba's 1-11, 1-10 Dromard, 29/7/2017, 
 Killoe Young Emmets 1-14, 2-11 Longford Slashers, 30/7/2017,  

Round 3:
 Mullinalaghta St Columba's 3-10, 0-13 Killoe Young Emmets, 11/8/2017
 Dromard 1-13, 2-8 Longford Slashers, 12/8/2017

Group B 

Round 1:
 Mostrim 3-11, 1-13 Clonguish, 21/7/2017, 
 Abbeylara 1-10, 0-6 Carrickedmond, 22/7/2017, 

Round 2:
 Abbeylara 1-14, 0-10 Mostrim, 29/7/2017, 
 Clonguish 2-13, 2-6 Carrickedmond, 30/7/2017, 

Round 3:
 Clonguish 1-12, 0-14 Abbeylara 13/8/2017
 Mostrim 2-12, 1-14 Carrickedmond, 13/8/2017

Group C 

Round 1:
 St Mary's Granard 2-10, 0-10 St Brigid's Kilashee, 15/7/2017, 
 Fr. Manning Gaels 1-8, 1-8 Ballymahon, 15/7/2017,
 Colmcille – Bye,

Round 2:
 Colmcille 0-12, 0-9 Fr. Manning Gaels, 23/7/2017, 
 Ballymahon 4-9, 1-6 St Mary's Granard, 23/7/2017, 
 St Brigid's Killashee – Bye,

Round 3:
 Ballymahon 0-12, 1-6 St Brigid's Killashee 28/7/2017, 
 Colmcille 1-14, 2-9 St Mary's Granard, 30/7/2017, 
 Fr. Manning Gaels – Bye,

Round 4:
 Colmcille 3-14, 2-8 St. Brigid's Killashee, 5/8/2017,
 Fr. Manning Gaels 1-14, 0-9 St. Mary's Granard, 5/8/2017, 
 Ballymahon – Bye,

Round 5:
 Fr. Manning Gaels 1-18, 2-12 St Brigid's Killashee, 12/8/2017
 Colmcille 2-13, 2-11 Ballymahon, 12/8/2017
 St Mary's Granard – Bye,

Knockout stage 
The top 8 teams from the league stages qualify for the quarter-finals. The winners of Groups A and B are kept on opposite sides of the draw.

Quarter-finals

Semi-finals

Final

Relegation Playoff

Relegation Final

Leinster Senior Club Football Championship

References 

Longford Senior Football Championship
Longford Senior Football Championship